Pachylis is a genus of leaf-footed bugs in the family Coreidae. There are about 10 described species in Pachylis.

Species
 Pachylis argentinus Berg, 1879
 Pachylis bipunctatus (Thunberg, 1825)
 Pachylis furvus Brailovsky & Guerrero, 2014
 Pachylis laticornis (Fabricius, 1798)
 Pachylis nervosus Dallas, 1852
 Pachylis obscurus Spinola, 1837
 Pachylis peramplus Brailovsky & Guerrero, 2014
 Pachylis pharaonis (Herbst, 1784)
 Pachylis striatus (Thunberg, 1825)
 Pachylis tenuicornis Dallas, 1852

References

Further reading

External links

 

Coreinae
Coreidae genera